Rachid Mimouni (In Arabic:رشيد ميموني) (20 November 1945 – 12 February 1995) was an Algerian writer, teacher and human rights activist. 

Mimouni wrote novels describing Algerian society in a realist style. He was threatened by Islamic militants for his stance against a movement which he described as being based on archaic ideas, irrelevant in the present time.

Biography
Rachid Mimouni was born in Boudouaou, 30 km from Algiers to a family of poor peasants.

Mimouni studied science at the University of Algiers before becoming a teacher at the École supérieure du commerce (business school) in Algiers.  He was president of the Kateb Yacine foundation and he also held the position of vice-president at Amnesty International. He fled Algeria for France in 1993 to escape the civil war and the assassinations of intellectuals.  He died in Paris in 1995 of hepatitis.

Works
 « Le printemps n'en sera que plus beau » (1978)
 « Le Fleuve détourné » (1982)
 « Une peine à vivre » (1983)
 « Tombéza » (1984)
 « L'Honneur de la tribu » (1989)
 « La ceinture de l'ogresse » (1990)
 « Une paix à vivre » (1991)
 « De la barbarie en général et de l'intégrisme en particulier » (1992)
 « La Malédiction » (1993)
 « Chroniques de Tanger » (1995)
 « Une peine à vivre »(1983)

Literary Awards
 Prix de l'Amitié Franco-Arabe (Fraco-Arab Friendship Award) for « L'honneur de la tribu » (1990)
 Prix de la critique littéraire : Ruban de la francophonie (Literary Critics Award, best Francophone novel) for « L'honneur de la tribu » (1990)
 Prix de littérature-cinéma du festival international du film à Cannes (Cannes Film Festival Film-Literature Award) for « L'honneur de la tribu » (1990)
 Prix de l'Académie française (Académie française Award) for « La ceinture de l'ogresse » (1991)
 Prix Hassan II des Quatre Jurys (Hassan II Four Juries Award ) for his complete works (1992)
 Prix Albert Camus (Albert Camus Award) for « Une peine à vivre et De la barbarie en général et de l’intégrisme en particulier » (1993)
 Prix du Levant (Levant Award) for « La malédiction » (1993)
 Prix Liberté Littéraire (Literary Freedom Award) for « La malédiction » (1994)
 Prix spécial Grand Atlas (Special Grand Atlas Award) for his complete works (1995)

References

1945 births
People from Boudouaou District
People from Boumerdès Province
Kabyle people
1995 deaths
Algerian writers
Deaths from hepatitis
People from Boudouaou
University of Algiers alumni
Amnesty International people